John "Run" Wrake (24 November 1965 – 21 October 2012) was an English animator, film director, graphic designer, and music video director. He was best known for his 2005 short film, Rabbit.

Early life and education
Wrake was born in Yemen on 24 November 1965. His father was a chaplain assigned to the British army there. He grew up in Sussex. He studied graphic design at the Chelsea College of Arts, later graduating with an M.A. in animation from the Royal College of Art in London. His 1990 animated student film from his days at the Royal College, Anyway, aired on MTV's Liquid Television in 1994.

Career
After graduating, Wrake worked freelance, illustrating and designing album covers and tour visuals for artists such as U2 and Howie B, in addition to directing commercials for companies such as Coca-Cola throughout the 1990s and early 2000s. He also directed music videos, many of which were for Howie B. He later began working with Animate Projects, which commissioned him to direct animated short films. In 2005, he released his animated short film entitled Rabbit, his most notable work. Rabbit tells a morality tale about the dangers of greed through a Dick and Jane art style. Wrake's main inspiration for the film was an envelope he found in a thrift shop containing children's educational stickers, illustrated by Geoffrey Higham, from the 1950s. The film received numerous awards and nominations, including a BAFTA nomination for Best Short Animation Film at the 2006 BAFTA Awards.

Death
In November 2011, Wrake was diagnosed with lung cancer. This inspired him to direct the short film, Down with the Dawn, with music by Howie B. On 21 October 2012, aged 46, Wrake succumbed to the illness.

Filmography

References

External links

 Official website
 
 Run Wrake at Discogs

1965 births
2012 deaths
Advertising directors
Album-cover and concert-poster artists
Alumni of Chelsea College of Arts
Alumni of the Royal College of Art
British animated film directors
English animators
English film directors
English graphic designers
English illustrators
English music video directors
People from Sussex